Conflans-Sainte-Honorine is a railway station in Conflans-Sainte-Honorine, a northwestern suburb of Paris, France. It is on the lines from Saint-Lazare to Pontoise and from Saint-Lazare to Mantes-la-Jolie via Meulan.

See also
 Transilien Paris – Saint-Lazare

External links
 

Railway stations in Yvelines
Railway stations in France opened in 1892
Conflans-Sainte-Honorine